Eastern Newsbeat is a local community television program in Melbourne, Australia on Channel 31 Melbourne.

The Producer of Eastern Newsbeat was Peter McArthur until 2014. McArthur was also President of C31 for 5 years until 2010 and was still a Director of the Board at Channel 31/Digital 44 until 2016.

Peter McArthur and Eastern Regional Access Television (ERA-TV) were instrumental in getting parliamentary support for Channel 31 to move from Analogue to Digital in 2014.

Bill Page took over as Producer in 2015 and continues to produce Eastern Newsbeat with Reporter/Producer Tricia Ziemer and Peter McArthur as a reporter.

As well as being the Producer of Eastern Newsbeat in the past, McArthur is also a member and secretary of one of the original community groups Eastern Regional Access Television INC and he helped establish Channel 31 Melbourne and Geelong as a community televisions station in 1994. 

ERA TV was created and founded by veteran television producer Phillip Lennox Harris later known for the River to Reef television series that ran for fourteen years.

After experiencing a short two week test transmission with RAT TV Richmond access television in 1990 ERA TV was established in 1991 in Belgrave Victoria. A community group was formed to produce over twenty hours of original productions recorded on 3/4" low band U-Matic tape. Consisting of music, comedy, drama and children's programs made with the studio and production equipment owned by Harris. The first two week test transmission of ERA TV was conducted from a Melbourne Water owned tower in Upwey using borrowed equipment including a 20watt UHF transmitter from RMIT. A makeshift studio was constructed under the tower for live presentation of programs including the very first news cast conducted by channel 10 presenter John Print. A portable site shed was the control room. Harris departed ERA TV in 1993 to pursue other projects and further his tv production career. 

ERA-TV also auspices three other television series at Channel 31/Digital 44.

The series "A House Around the Corner", produced and directed by Tricia Ziemer, which features Learn Local Centres across Australia. The show ran for two seasons from 2013 to 2014 on C31 in Melbourne, Perth, and Adelaide.

The third season was called "A Green House Around the Corner"  shown in 2015 and featured Learn Local Centres across Australia who remodeled to add sustainability features, such as Solar Power, to decrease their running costs and their carbon footprint so they could maintain low training fees for their students.

The other series that ERA-TV auspice, Produced and Directed by Tricia Ziemer, is called "Kidz in the Kitchen" with Gabriel Gate', the French-Australian Chef. The show is starting its 8th season in 2016 on C31 Melbourne, Adelaide and Perth.

References

Australian community access television shows